Lac-Matapédia is an unorganized territory in the Bas-Saint-Laurent region of Quebec, Canada. It is named after and located on the northern shores of Lake Matapedia in the Matapédia Valley.

The territory is home to a small protected area, Lac-Matapédia Forest Refuge that was established in 2008 to protect three populations of the calypso orchid (Calypso bulbosa), a plant designated as threatened or vulnerable in Quebec. A part of the remainder of the territory is being considered for the creation of a new provincial park.

Demographics
Population trend:
 Population in 2021: 10 (2016 to 2021 population change: 100%)
 Population in 2016: 5 
 Population in 2011: 5 
 Population in 2006: 10
 Population in 2001: 0
 Population in 1996: 4
 Population in 1991: 0

Private dwellings occupied by usual residents: 8 (total dwellings: 18)

Gallery

See also
 Lake Matapédia
 List of unorganized territories in Quebec

References

Unorganized territories in Bas-Saint-Laurent
La Matapédia Regional County Municipality